The by-thirds 2019 Elmbridge Borough Council election took place on 2 May 2019 to elect members of Elmbridge Borough Council in England. This was on the same day as other local elections.

Ward results

Claygate

Cobham & Downside

Esher

 
 
 

 

*stood as Esher Residents Association.

Hersham Village

Hinchley Wood & Weston Green

Long Ditton

Molesey East

Molesey West

Oatlands & Burwood Park

Oxshott & Stoke D'Abernon

Thames Ditton

Walton Central

Walton North

Walton South

Weybridge Riverside

Weybridge St. George's Hall

References

2019 English local elections
May 2019 events in the United Kingdom
2019
2010s in Surrey